The Armagh Intermediate Football Championship is an annual Gaelic football competition contested by mid-tier Armagh GAA clubs. The national media covers the competition.

Carrickcruppen, St Patrick's are the title holders (2021) defeating Culloville in the Final.

History
The 2014 Armagh IFC winning club was St Paul's, which defeated the Grange by a scoreline of 2-13 to 2-10. Andrew Murnin gave a match-winning performance in the final.

The competition is often contested by senior inter-county players, for example, Clan na Gael's Stefan Campbell (who was captain of Armagh at the time) contested the 2020 final, a game in which he went up against another of Armagh's leading full-forwards, Andrew Murnin of St Paul's.

Honours
The trophy presented to the winners is the ? The Armagh IFC winner qualifies for the Ulster Intermediate Club Football Championship. It is the only team from County Armagh to qualify for this competition. The Armagh IFC winner may enter the Ulster Intermediate Club Football Championship at either the preliminary round or the quarter-final stage. 

The Armagh IFC winners — by winning the Ulster Intermediate Club Football Championship — may qualify for the All-Ireland Intermediate Club Football Championship, at which it would enter at the semi-final stage, providing it hasn't been drawn to face the British champions in the quarter-finals.

List of finals

Notes
† The 1965 runner-up may have been Tom Williams GFC, an amalgamation of Dorsey and Cullyhanna.

References

External links
 Official Armagh GAA Website

Gaelic football competitions in County Armagh
Intermediate Gaelic football county championships